The South Atlantic Intercollegiate Athletic Association (SAIAA) was an intercollegiate athletic conference with its main focus of promoting track and arranging track meets. Its member schools were located in the states of Maryland, Virginia, North Carolina, as well as the District of Columbia. 

The conference's membership was centered in the South Atlantic region of the United States, which remains in the Southern United States and on the coast of the Atlantic, but is above and contrasted with the Deep South  (which had the Southern Intercollegiate Athletic Association). It is sometimes known as the Tidewater region. Several of its members are today in the Atlantic Coast Conference.

The SAIAA was first formed in 1912 and remained active until 1921.  The conference disbanded in 1921, and six of its schools became founding members of the Southern Conference along with eight other schools from the southeast United States. Those six SAIAA schools were:  North Carolina, North Carolina State, Virginia, Virginia Tech, Maryland and Washington and Lee.

Membership
 
The following universities were members of the SAIAA at some point during its existence. Where known, the school's name is followed by the period of its membership in the conference. Italicized years indicate a confirmed year of membership, but may not be exhaustive. Track meets were held in 1911, and 1912 was the first season of play for all sports.
Catholic 1916–1921
Davidson 1916–1921
George Washington 1916–1921
Georgetown 1911–1921
Johns Hopkins 1911–1921
Maryland 1916–1921
North Carolina 1911–1921
North Carolina State 1911–1921
Richmond 1911–1921
St. John's (MD) 1921
Trinity College 1916–1921
Virginia 1911–1921
Virginia Polytechnic Institute 1911–1921
Virginia Military Institute 1916–1921
Washington and Lee 1911–1921
William & Mary 1916–1921

Football champions

See also
 College Football All-Southern Team''

References

External links
South Atlantic Intercollegiate Athletic Association Conference Championships , College Football Data Warehouse.